Vincent Philip Koch (born 13 March 1990) is a South African professional rugby union player who currently plays for Stade Français in the Top 14 and the South Africa national team.

Club career

In 2016 he joined English side Saracens. During his time at Saracens he has won two Premiership titles in 2018 and 2019. He also helped Saracens win the European Champions Cup in 2017 and 2019.

On 9 December 2021, Koch would leave Saracens after five seasons at the club to join Premiership rivals Wasps on a long term deal ahead of the 2022-23 season.

Wasps entered administration on 17 October 2022 and Koch was made redundant along with all other players and coaching staff.

On 27 October 2022 it was confirmed that Koch had signed for French Top 14 side Stade Français.

International career
In 2013, he was included in a South Africa President's XV team that played in the 2013 IRB Tbilisi Cup and won the tournament after winning all three matches.

In 2016, Koch was included in a South Africa 'A' squad that played a two-match series against a touring England Saxons team. He was named in the starting line-up for their first match in Bloemfontein, but ended on the losing side as the visitors ran out 32–24 winners.

Koch was named in South Africa's squad for the 2019 Rugby World Cup. South Africa won the tournament, defeating England in the final.

References

External links
 
 

1990 births
Living people
South African rugby union players
Pumas (Currie Cup) players
Blue Bulls players
Stormers players
Saracens F.C. players
Wasps RFC players
Rugby union props
People from Empangeni
Afrikaner people
South Africa international rugby union players
Rugby union players from KwaZulu-Natal